Goichi (written: 剛一 or 吾一) is a masculine Japanese given name. Notable people with the name include:

 (born 1979), Japanese footballer
Goichi Oya, Imperial Japanese Navy officer
 (born 1968), Japanese video game designer

Japanese masculine given names